Highway 766 is a provincial highway in the Canadian province of Saskatchewan. It runs from Highway 7 at Delisle to Highway 60. Highway 766 is about 23 km (14 mi.) long.

Intersections from west to east

See also 
Roads in Saskatchewan
Transportation in Saskatchewan

References 

766